Each reference station in the Wide Area Augmentation System includes three GPS antennas.  The coordinates of each antenna, along with its elevation, are listed below.

References